Ardington is an English toponymic surname. Notable people with the surname include:

 Anthony Ardington (born 1940), South African cricketer
 Mark Williams Ardington, British visual effects artist

See also
 Addington (surname)
 

English toponymic surnames